Rubén Medinaceli Ortiz (born 17 January 1952) is a Bolivian senator. He resigned in the 2019 Bolivian political crisis alongside President Evo Morales.

References

Members of the Senate of Bolivia
1952 births
Living people
Place of birth missing (living people)